The Letneye mine is a large copper mine located in the south-west region of Russia in Orenburg Oblast. Letneye represents one of the largest copper reserve in not only Russia but also in the world having estimated reserves of 272 million tonnes of ore grading 2.89% copper.

See also 
 List of mines in Russia

References 

Copper mines in Russia